Part XV of the Constitution of India consists of Articles on Elections. Article 324 of the Constitution provides that the power of superintendence, direction and control of elections to parliament, state legislatures, the office of president of India and the office of vice-president of India shall be vested in the Election Commission.

Articles 324 – 329
Article 324: Superintendence, direction and control of elections to be vested in an Election Commission.

Article 325: No person to be ineligible for inclusion in, or to claim to be included in a special electoral roll on ground of religion, race, caste or sex.

Article 326: Elections to the Lok Sabha and Legislative Assemblies of States to be on the basis of adult suffrage.

Article 327: Power of Parliament to make provision with respect to elections to legislature.

Article 328: Power of Legislature of a State to make provision with respect to elections to such Legislature.

Article 329: Bar to interference by courts in electoral matters.

Article 329A
Special provision as to elections to Parliament in the case of Prime Minister and Speaker

Inserted by the Constitution (39th Amendment) Act, 1975.

Repealed by the Constitution (44th Amendment) Act, 1978 (w.e.f. 20-6-1979).

References

Sources

Part XV text from wikisource

Part 15
Election law in India